The Black Helen Handicap was an American Thoroughbred horse race run annually at Hialeah Park Race Track in Hialeah, Florida, from 1941 through 2001. Open to fillies and mares age three and older, the Grade II event was raced on turf at a distance of a mile and an eighth (9 furlongs).

The race was named for Edward R. Bradley's U.S. Racing Hall of Fame mare Black Helen. The inaugural running took place on February 8, 1941, and was won by Sweet Willow at a distance of seven furlongs. The following year the race was run at a mile and an eighth and would remain at that distance for all subsequent editions.

Historical notes
In 1948 the Black Helen Handicap had a Dead heat for win between Shotsilk and Rampart. It marked a rarity for a dead heat in that Rampart carried the highweight, in the field of ten, and Shotsilk the low weight. Fitz Eugene Dixon Jr.'s Shotsilk would turn out to be the only three-year-old to ever win the race.

Bewitch won the 1950 Black Helen Handicap by seven lengths in a time of 1:48 flat for a mile and one-eighth that was just 2/5 of a second off the World Record.

In 1968, Treacherous won the Black Helen Handicap but her win was overshadowed by jockey Ángel Cordero Jr. who set a Hialeah track record by riding six winners that day. One horse Cordero Jr. did not ride was Treacherous.

The 2000 running of the Black Helen Handicap was run at Gulfstream Park. It returned to Hialeah Park in 2001 for what would prove to be the final edition.

Records
Speed record:
 1:46.71 @ 1 miles – Class Kris (1996)

Most wins:
 In its 58 runnings, no horse ever won this race more than once.

Most wins by a jockey:
 3 – Eddie Maple (1984, 1985, 1987)

Most wins by a trainer:
 4 – H. Allen Jerkens (1963, 1967, 1970, 1975)

Most wins by an owner:
 4 – Calumet Farm (1950, 1957, 1959, 1954)

Winners

References

Discontinued horse races
Turf races in the United States
Graded stakes races in the United States
Horse races in Florida
Hialeah Park
Recurring sporting events established in 1941
Recurring sporting events disestablished in 2001
1941 establishments in Florida
2001 disestablishments in Florida